Islington Heronry is a  biological Site of Special Scientific Interest  south-west of King's Lynn  Norfolk.

This stand of mature oaks has the largest breeding colony of grey herons in the county, with about eighty nests occupied each year. There are several other populations of woodland birds, such as the great spotted woodpecker.

The site is private land with no public access.

References

Sites of Special Scientific Interest in Norfolk